The simple station Fucha is part of the TransMilenio mass-transit system of Bogotá, Colombia, opened in the year 2000.

Etymology 
The station is named Fucha due to its proximity to the channel of the Fucha River, which runs along Calle 13 Sur. Fucha means "her" or "female" in Muysccubun, the language of the indigenous Muisca who inhabited the Bogotá savanna before the Spanish conquest.

Location 
The station is located in southern Bogotá, specifically on Avenida Caracas, with Calles 17 and 18A sur.

It serves the Ciudad Jardín and Restrepo neighborhoods.

History 
At the beginning of 2001, the second phase of the Caracas line of the system was opened from Tercer Milenio to the intermediate station Calle 40 Sur. A few months later, service was extended south to Portal de Usme.

Station services

Old trunk services

Current Trunk Services

Feeder routes 
This station does not have connections to feeder routes.

Inter-city service 
This station does not have any inter-city service.

See also 
 Bogotá
 TransMilenio
 List of TransMilenio Stations

References 

TransMilenio
Fucha
2001 establishments in Colombia